is a type of Japanese pottery traditionally from Imado, presently a part of Asakusa, Tokyo.

External links 

 http://imadoki.server-shared.com
 http://www.amy.hi-ho.ne.jp/mizuy/arc/imadoyaki/dorokama.htm

Culture in Tokyo
Japanese pottery